Desmond Clyde Bell (born 23 May 1923) was a former Australian rules footballer who played with Melbourne in the Victorian Football League (VFL).

Personal life
Bell was born at Creswick, Victoria on 23 May 1923. He married Nina Helen Dora Thomson in 1948.

Bell served overseas as a gunner in the Australian Army during the Second World War.

Notes

References
 
 World War Two Nominal Roll: Gunner Desmond Clyde Bell (VX113976), Department of Veterans' Affairs.
 World War Two Nominal Roll: Gunner Desmond Clyde Bell (VX113976), National Archives of Australia.

External links 
 
 
 Des Bell, at Demonwiki.

1923 births
Possibly living people
Australian rules footballers from Victoria (Australia)
Melbourne Football Club players
Australian Army personnel of World War II
Australian Army soldiers